Oeonistis is a genus of moths in the family Erebidae first described by Jacob Hübner in 1819. They are found in India, Sri Lanka, Myanmar, Borneo and other minor islands of Oceania.

Description
Palpi porrect (extending forward), the second joint fringed with hair. Antennae of male bipectinated, with short branches and with a bristle from the end. Forewing very long and narrow. Vein 3 from before angle of cell. Veins 4 and 5 from angle, vein 6 from upper angle and veins 7 to 9 stalked. Areole absent. Hindwing with veins 4 and 5 stalked. Veins 6 and 7 on a short stalk and vein 8 from middle of cell.

Species
 Oeonistis altica (Linnaeus, 1768)
 Oeonistis bicolora Bethune-Baker, 1904
 Oeonistis bistrigata Rothschild, 1912
 Oeonistis delia Fabricius, 1787
 Oeonistis entella Cramer, 1779

References

Lithosiina
Moth genera